This page provides supplementary chemical data on dimethyl sulfoxide.

Material Safety Data Sheet  

The handling of this chemical may incur notable safety precautions. It is highly recommend that you seek the Material Safety Datasheet (MSDS) for this chemical from a reliable source  such as SIRI, and follow its directions. MSDS is available at Mallinckrodt Baker.

Structure and properties

Thermodynamic properties

Vapor pressure of liquid
vapor pressure at 20 °C = 0.556 mbar = 0.417 mmHg

Distillation data

Spectral data

References

 

Chemical data pages
Chemical data pages cleanup